Hey Petrunko is the second album by Ooberman, released in March 2003 on the band's own Rotodisc label. It was recorded and produced by the band.

Three singles were released in support of the album - Running Girl, Beany Bean (not featured on the album itself) and First Day of The Holidays. In addition, a mini-album with Running Girl as the lead track, and an EP centering on Bluebell Morning were released. Where Did I Go Wrong? was issued as a single under the pseudonym The Sentinels, retitled Memoirs of a Cunt.

Track listing

 "Hatch Opens" (Popplewell)
 "Bluebell Morning" (Popplewell/Flett)
 "Running Girl" (Popplewell)
 "Dreams In The Air" (Popplewell)
 "Where Did I Go Wrong?" (Popplewell)
 "Hand That Gets Burnt" (Flett)
 "SnakeDance" (Popplewell)
 "Open The Hatch" (Popplewell)
 "Cities That Fall" (Flett)
 "Abstract Sky" (Popplewell)
 "Petrunka's Dream" (Popplewell/Churney)
 "First Day of the Holidays" (Popplewell)
 "Secret World" (Popplewell)
 "The Clearing" (Popplewell)
 "Summer Nights In June" (Flett)

Personnel

Ooberman
 Sophia Churney - vocals
 Andy Flett - guitars
 Steve Flett - bass guitar
 Jaymie Ireland - drums
 Dan Popplewell - drums, vocals, guitars, violin, piano, keyboards, programming, recorder and Irish whistle

Additional players
 Andrew Carpenter - violin and viola
 Geoff Churney - voiceover
 Liz McIlwaine - cello
 Paul Walsham - drums

Recording
Arranged, produced, mixed and mastered by Dan Popplewell at Ooberman HQ.  
All vocals and instruments except drums recorded at Ooberman HQ (December 1999-October 2002, Liverpool).
Drums recorded by Tim Speed at Elevator Studios and Great Northern Studios by Rob Ferrier.

Equipment
Hey Petrunko was created on the following instruments:
 Tacoma acoustic [guitar]
 Mexican Telecaster
 Liz McIlwaine's cello
 Canon BJC 80 Printer Beep
 Gibson Les Paul
 Fender Jazz Bass
 £20 Chinese violin
 Andrew Carpenter's 1899 Strad copy
 Andrew Carpenter's Gresswell Viola
 Alan Kelly's Yellow Tambourine
 Skinnie's Fender Precision Bass
 Roland VS-1680 (on every track)
 Mike Doyle's Prophet 5
 Tim Speed's Juno 106
 Geoff Churney's Bechstein Grand [piano]
 Mike Doyle's Hammond B4
 Blind School Piano
 Irish Whistle
 Dictaphone
 Ludwig Super Classic 1971 Kit
 Pearl Masters Kit
 Paul Walsham's Yamaha Studio Kit

Hey Petrunko plus...
A different version of the album, entitled Hey Petrunko plus..., was released in Japan on 4 May 2003 by Art Union, featuring ten tracks from the UK version of the album, six previously released non-album tracks and two new recordings, including new song Falling Down (which later appeared on the UK release of the Carried Away album)

 "Hatch Opens" (Popplewell)
 "First Day Of The Holidays" (Popplewell)
 "Falling Down" (Popplewell)
 "Heavy Duty (New Recording)" (Flett)
 "Beany Bean" (Popplewell)
 "Hand That Gets Burnt" (Flett)
 "Heroes And Villains" (Popplewell)
 "Summer Nights In June" (Flett)
 "Car Song" (Flett)
 "Bluebell Morning" (Popplewell/Flett)
 "Running Girl" (Popplewell)
 "Why Did My Igloo Collapse?" (Popplewell)
 "Dolphin Blue" (Popplewell)
 "Live Again (Don't Die Father)" (Flett)
 "SnakeDance" (Popplewell)
 "Cities That Fall" (Flett)
 "Dreams In The Air" (Popplewell)
 "Secret World" (Popplewell)

External links 
 The Magic Treehouse – Ooberman fansite

2003 albums
Ooberman albums
Albums recorded at Elevator Studios